Jaroslav Modrý (born 27 February 1971) is a Czech former professional ice hockey defenseman who played 13 seasons in the National Hockey League (NHL) for the New Jersey Devils, Ottawa Senators, Los Angeles Kings, Atlanta Thrashers, Dallas Stars, and Philadelphia Flyers.

Playing career
Modrý was selected 179th overall in the ninth round of the 1990 NHL Entry Draft by the New Jersey Devils. He made his NHL debut with the Devils during the 1993–94 season. A trade to the Ottawa Senators in July 1995 was followed months later in March 1996 by a trade to the  Los Angeles Kings. Modrý started seeing more playing time in the NHL and eventually became an NHL regular with the Kings, playing his first full season in 2000–01. The following season, 2001–02, saw Modrý set career highs in assists (38) and points (42) and play in the NHL All-Star Game. He scored a career high 13 goals in 2002–03.

After the 2003–04 season, Modrý left the Kings as an unrestricted free agent and signed with the Atlanta Thrashers. He returned to the Czech Extraliga and played for HC Liberec during the 2004–05 NHL lockout. After only one season with Atlanta, Modrý was traded along with Patrik Štefan to the Dallas Stars for Niko Kapanen and a 2006 7th round draft pick. After playing half of the 2006–07 season with the Stars, Dallas sent him back to the Kings as part of a deadline-day deal to acquire former Kings teammate Mattias Norström. A year later during the following season, Modrý was on the move again as the Kings traded him to the Philadelphia Flyers for a 2008 3rd round draft pick.

Modrý left the NHL for the Czech Extraliga when he signed a two-year contract with HC Liberec for the 2008–09 season. He took up the position of captain upon his arrival in Liberec. At the end of the season, however, he left the club. Modrý left Liberec on 1 May 2009 and signed with HC Plzeň.

Later
After his playing career concluded, Modrý got involved in coaching youth hockey.  As of 2016, he was working as a youth coach in the Los Angeles Kings organization.

Career statistics

Regular season and playoffs

International

References

External links
 

1971 births
Living people
Albany River Rats players
Atlanta Thrashers players
Czech ice hockey defencemen
Dallas Stars players
HC Bílí Tygři Liberec players
Motor České Budějovice players
HC Plzeň players
Los Angeles Kings players
Long Beach Ice Dogs (IHL) players
National Hockey League All-Stars
New Jersey Devils draft picks
New Jersey Devils players
Ottawa Senators players
Sportspeople from České Budějovice
Philadelphia Flyers players
Phoenix Roadrunners (IHL) players
Utah Grizzlies (IHL) players
Utica Devils players
HK Dukla Trenčín players
Czech ice hockey coaches
Czech expatriate ice hockey players in the United States
Czech expatriate ice hockey players in Canada
Czechoslovak ice hockey defencemen